"Anna Is a Stool Pigeon" is a single from Against Me! singer/songwriter Laura Jane Grace, released under her birth name. The song was released as a 7" vinyl single on November 11, 2008 on Sabot Productions. This song relates the true story of Eric McDavid and "Anna" (a paid FBI informant). It was Grace's only solo single until her cover  of "The Best Ever Death Metal Band in Denton" by The Mountain Goats for the podcast I Only Listen to the Mountain Goats in 2017.

Track listing

Personnel

Band
 Laura Jane Grace – guitar, lead vocals
 Chuck Ragan – Background vocals and harmonica on "Anna Is a Stool Pigeon"
 Butch Vig – drums on "Anna Is a Stool Pigeon"

Production 
 Butch Vig – producer
 Billy Bush – recording engineer
 Emily Lazar and Joe LaPorta – mastering

Art and design 
 Steak Mtn. – art direction, design, typography, and illustration

See also
Against Me! discography

References

2008 singles
Songs written by Laura Jane Grace
Song recordings produced by Butch Vig
2008 songs